Thakkadi (தக்கடி) is a Sri Lankan food. The dish consists of rice balls or dumplings covered in a sauce and cooked in a mutton salna, (a spicy gravy). Thakkadi originated from the Moor community in Sri Lanka.

Overview 
Thakkadi is made from steamed rice flour balls cooked in a mutton salna. The balls are made of rice flour, finely sliced shallots, chopped curry leaves and shredded coconut. They are then cooked in a spicy meat (either mutton or beef or even chicken) stew or dipped in spiced curry.

References 

Sri Lankan cuisine
Rice dishes
Meat dishes
Tamil cuisine